Qamar Zaman Kaira (born 5 January 1960) is the former Minister of Information and Mass-Media Broadcasting in the Government of Pakistan. He is Incumbent advisor on Kashmir Affairs to current Prime Minister Shehbaz Sharif.

Before heading the ministry of Information, Kaira was the minister of the ministry of Kashmir and Northern Areas and later ascended as acting Governor of Gilgit–Baltistan in 2009. His career in the national politics started in 2002 on a platform of Pakistan Peoples Party and has pioneered many articles on political philosophy and raised a voice for democracy in the country. After succeeding Sherry Rehman as minister of information in 2009, he lost his ministry in 2011 to Firdous Ashiq Awan. However, in 2012, he was again reappointed in the ministry of information after a cabinet reshuffle.
His son Osama Zaman Kaira died in a road accident on 17 May 2019 in Lala Musa in an attempt to save a motorcyclist, losing control of the car and crashing into a nearby tree. He was laid to rest on 18 May in the same city.

Education 
Kaira was born in Lalamusa, Gujrat on 5 January 1960. He belongs to a political family from Gujrat. After attending a local high school, Kaira matriculated and passed intermediate college testing examinations. 

After attending a F.G. Community College at Kharian Military District, Kaira made college transfer to Forman Christian University. There he enrolled in the Department of Philosophy and earned a BA in Philosophy from Forman Christian University in 1983. Kaira later applied for a graduate school of the University of Punjab to resume his higher education. In 1985, Kaira wrote his thesis for double master's degrees and subsequently obtained an MA in philosophy of politics and an MS in political science from the Punjab University.

Political career 
Kaira was elected to the National Assembly for the first time in 2002 and remained a member of lower House until 2007. He returned to the National Assembly of Pakistan for the second consecutive term and became a minister in the coalition government of PPP, ANP, MQM and JUI-F formed after the 2008 elections. 

He is a senior leader of Pakistan Peoples Party, having won from his local constituency in Gujrat. He was selected to the office of Federal Minister for Kashmir Affairs and Northern Areas on 31 March 2008, and was given the additional office of Federal Minister for Information on 14 March 2009.

Other positions held 
1st Governor of Gilgit Baltistan
Minister for Kashmir Affairs  and Gilgit Baltistan
Minister for Information Media and BroadCasting
Member National Assembly 2002–2007
Member National Assembly 2008-2013
Advisor to Prime Minister 2022-To date

References 

1960 births
Living people
Forman Christian College alumni
University of the Punjab alumni
Pakistan People's Party politicians
Government of Yousaf Raza Gillani
Information Ministers of Pakistan
People from Gujrat District
BOL Network people
Politicians from Gujrat, Pakistan
Governors of Gilgit-Baltistan